Scrobipalpa murinella is a moth in the family Gelechiidae. It was described by Philogène Auguste Joseph Duponchel in 1843. It is found in the Alps, Carpathian Mountains, Ireland, Great Britain, northern Europe and Ukraine.

Adults are on wing from April to June.

The larvae feed on Antennaria dioica and Omalotheca supina. They mine the leaves of their host plant. The mine starts as a linear corridor that starts at the base. Later, leaves are split open from the side and completely mined out. Mined leaves turn yellow and swell up. Pupation takes place in such a swollen leaf. The species overwinters in the pupal stage.

References

Scrobipalpa
Moths described in 1843